The 1st cabinet of executive ministers of Turkey (3 May 1920 – 24 January 1921 ) was the first government formed by the nationalists during the Turkish War of Independence. The Republic was not yet proclaimed and the government was called  ("cabinet of executive ministers")

Background 
The chairman of the cabinet (equivalent to prime minister) was Mustafa Kemal Pasha (later named Atatürk.) The other members of the cabinet were elected by the parliament one by one.

The government
In the list below, the name in parentheses is the surname the cabinet members assumed later (see Surname Law of 1934).

Aftermath
The chairman of the next cabinet was Fevzi Pasha who was the Minister of Defence in the first cabinet.
After the proclamation of the Republic the Republican governments were renumbered beginning by 1st government of Turkey

References

Politics of Turkey
1920 establishments in the Ottoman Empire
1921 disestablishments in the Ottoman Empire
Pre-Republic Turkey